L'Autrichienne is a 1989 French film directed by Pierre Granier-Deferre, released in 1989.

Synopsis

The film depicts the last days of Marie-Antoinette of Austria, played by Ute Lemper, showing her trial and execution. It was directed during the celebrations of the bicentenary of the French Revolution. With a script written by Alain Decaux and André Castelot based on the minutes from the trial of the Queen, L'Autrichienne is for the most part a closed hearing with scenes of the trial and at the Conciergerie, punctuated by flash-back sequences.

Cast
 Ute Lemper : Marie Antoinette
 Patrick Chesnais : Herman
 Daniel Mesguich : Fouquier-Tinville
 Philippe Leroy : D'Estaing
 Rufus : Girard
 Pierre Clémenti : Hébert
 Paul Le Person : Simon
 Isabelle Nanty : Queen Milliot
 Vincent Grass : Roussillon

References

External links

1989 films
1980s historical films
French historical films
1980s French-language films
Films directed by Pierre Granier-Deferre
Films about Marie Antoinette
1980s French films
1990s French films